The  (plural of , Italian for "Sacred Mountain") of Piedmont and Lombardy are a series of nine calvaries or groups of chapels and other architectural features created in northern Italy during the late sixteenth century and the seventeenth century. They are dedicated to various aspects of the Christian faith and are considered of great beauty by virtue of the skill with which they have been integrated into the surrounding natural landscape of hills, forests and lakes. They also house important artistic materials in the form of wall paintings and statuary. In 2003, they were named as a World Heritage Site.

Model and characteristics 
The model of the calvary or "holy mountain" is a Christian creation dating from the late fifteenth century, that during the Counter-Reformation spread from Italy to Europe and the New World. A calvary is a devotional complex standing on the slopes of a mountain, with a series of chapels or kiosks containing scenes from the life of Christ, the Virgin Mary or the Saints, in the form of painting or sculptures.

As a re-evocation of the New Jerusalem, Sacred Mountains offered pilgrims an opportunity to visit the Holy Places by conjuring up, on a smaller scale, the buildings in which Christ's Passion took place. The Sacred Mountains stand on high ground, at some distance from the town centre, in a more natural setting. They are usually reached by pilgrimage. The itinerary leading up to the Sacred Mountain often re-evokes the Via Dolorosa, the road leading from Jerusalem to Calvary along which Christ carried the Cross.

The nine
The nine Sacri Monti included in the World Heritage Site are:

The Sacro Monte of Nuova Gerusalemme (New Jerusalem) of Varallo Sesia (1486), Varallo Sesia, province of Vercelli
The Sacro Monte of Santa Maria Assunta, Serralunga di Crea (1589), province of Alessandria
The Sacro Monte of San Francesco, Orta San Giulio (1590), province of Novara
The Sacro Monte of the Rosary, Varese (1598)
The Sacro Monte of the Blessed Virgin, Oropa (1617), province of Biella
The Sacro Monte of the Blessed Virgin of Succour, Ossuccio (1635), province of Como
The Sacro Monte of the Holy Trinity, Ghiffa (1591), province of Verbano-Cusio-Ossola
The Sacro Monte and Calvary, Domodossola (1657), province of Verbano-Cusio-Ossola
The Sacro Monte of Belmonte, Valperga (1712), Metropolitan City of Turin

See also
 Life of Jesus in the New Testament

External links

Sacri Monti of Piedmont and Lombardy , UNESCO World Heritage Site entry
Sacri Monti of Piedmont and Lombardy , sacrimonti.net

 
World Heritage Sites in Italy
Sacred mountains
Mountains associated with Christian monasticism